Kut-e Shannuf (also Romanized as Kūt-e Shannūf, Kūt-e-Shanūf, and Kūt Shanūf; also known as Del Āvīz) is a village in Minubar Rural District, Arvandkenar District, Abadan County, Khuzestan Province, Iran. At the 2006 census, its population was 1,425, in 241 families.

References 

Populated places in Abadan County